HMS Thunder was a 13-gun bomb vessel, used by the Royal Navy for cruising and land bombardment duties between 1719 and 1734. Constructed for the Spanish Navy, she was captured by the British in 1718 and recommissioned for Mediterranean service, including as part of Admiral Charles Wager's fleet. Despite extensive repairs she was eventually declared unseaworthy, and was broken up at Deptford Dockyard in 1734.

References

Bibliography

Further reading

Captured ships
Bomb vessels of the Royal Navy